QRG can refer to any of the following:

"QRG?" = What is My Frequency? (a Q code used by amateur radio operators)
Qurate Retail Group
Quick reference guide, a shortened version of a user manual